Indies Empire style (Dutch: Indisch Rijksstijl) is an architectural style that flourished in the colonial Dutch East Indies (now Indonesia) between the middle of the 18th century and the end of the 19th century. The style is an imitation of neoclassical Empire Style which was popular in mid-19th-century France. Conformed to the tropical setting of Indonesia, the style became known in the Dutch East Indies as Indies Empire style.

History

Rise of the Indies Empire style
The development of the Indies Empire style is strongly related with the Indies culture, a society of mixed descendants which developed in the Dutch East Indies. Indies people associated themselves with high status and expressed themselves by building opulent country houses usually associated with European aristocrats. Many of these country houses appeared in the periphery of Batavia around the middle of 17th-century, the architectural style of which reached its peak when it merged completely with the Javanese local architecture, a new style known as the Old Indies style.

With the arrival of Herman Willem Daendels in early 19th-century, the development of the architectural style of these country houses took a different course. Daendels was a former colonel-general of Louis Bonaparte from France. At that time, a neoclassical architectural movement named Empire Style was popular in France. When Daendels was made the Governor-General of the Dutch East Indies, he made Empire Style popular in the Dutch East Indies. Conformed with the tropical architecture of Indonesia, the style became known as the Indies Empire Style.

By the end of 19th-century, clubhouses and playhouses were built in big cities of the Indies such as Batavia, Semarang and Surabaya; most were built following the Indies Empire style trend. City development at the end of 19th-century also influenced the form of Indies Empire style. The lack of available space in city centers required modification of typical Indies Empire styled houses. Stone columns were replaced with wooden or narrow iron columns, usually imported from the Netherlands. Also changing was the additions of corrugated steel shades supported by cast iron consoles to protect the windows and the front porch from rainwater and sun. Examples of Indies Empire style houses from this later period are the Jakarta Textile Museum and some houses in Jalan Bubutan, Surabaya.

In the 19th century, the Indies Empire style is considered a representative of the "uptown" of Batavia, the area south of the "downtown" Kota Tua. Indies Empire Style is described as a trend in which houses were built in "...one storey with large gardens, with front and back galleries and high and wide halls; houses with hanging roofs where shade, air and coolness were the dominant privileges...", compared with the earlier Dutch style houses in Kota Tua, described as houses with "...high dark rooms with the beamed ceilings, the white painted walls and the red tiled floors."

Decline
Indies Empire style flourished until early 20th century, when the style was met with criticism. Indies Empire style in Indonesia was not a work of a professional architect, but a design of the building supervisor (opzichter). Modern academics such as architects Berlage and Moojen considered the Indies Empire style buildings to be low in quality; which led to a renaissance of architectural style which sought a new unique identity specially attributed to the culture of Dutch Indies. Later a new style emerged, known as the New Indies Style, a modern movement and a branch of Dutch Rationalism which at the end replaced the Indies Empire style.

Characteristics

Indies Empire style is essentially Empire Style conformed into the tropical setting of the Dutch East Indies. Similar with the Empire Style, Indies Empire Style made an eclectic use of antique motifs – usually Greco-Roman – to imitate an imperial colonial dynasty. Few buildings in the Indies make reference to the Gothic style e.g. the residence of Raden Saleh. Layout is symmetrical, with high ceiling, thick walls, and marble floor. Buildings often have a front (voorgalerij) and rear gallery (achtergalerij), flanked with Greek columns. This front and rear porticos are very spacious compared with its original European-style to improve cross ventilation into the interior as well as protecting it from intense tropical heat and rain – a European attempt to imitate the local pringgitan, a Javanese veranda with a bamboo bench where people may sleep during a hot noon. Furniture may be placed in the portico. An afternoon dance party or a card game are usually held in the portico, a tradition which mimics a French tradition more than a Dutch or Javanese tradition.

An Indies Empire Style building has a symmetrical layout and composition. It consists of a main building, sometimes with additional pavilions situated at both sides of the main building. The main building contains a central hall which connects both the front and rear portico as well as various rooms inside. A gallery connects the main building with a service building which contains rooms for slaves, storage, kitchen, and other service facilities. The whole compound is situated in a large piece of land with spacious gardens at the front, rear, and sides of the main building. Tropical palm trees usually decorate this landscaping.

Examples
  
Indies Empire style buildings can still be found in major colonial cities in Indonesia such as Jakarta and Surabaya. Below are notable examples of Indies Empire style in Indonesia.
 
Residential buildings
Gedung Pancasila (Jakarta, 1830)
Istana Bogor (Bogor, 1856)
Istana Merdeka (Jakarta, 1873)
Istana Negara (Jakarta, 1804–1848)
Jakarta City Hall (Jakarta)
Marine Hotel, Batavia (Jakarta, 1815?)
National Gallery of Indonesia – main building (Jakarta, 1817)
Palace of Daendels, now A.A. Maramis Building (1809)
Civic buildings
Fine Art and Ceramic Museum (Jakarta, 1870)
Gedung Kesenian Jakarta (Jakarta, 1821)
Jakarta Immanuel Church Jakarta, 1839)
National Museum of Indonesia (Jakarta, 1862)
Societeit Harmonie (Jakarta, 1815)

See also

List of colonial buildings and structures in Jakarta (late 18th century to 1870)
Colonial architecture of Indonesia
Rumah adat
Landhuis
New Indies Style
Rumah Melayu
Sino-Portuguese architecture
Bahay kubo
Bahay na bato
Earthquake Baroque

References

Works cited

Architectural styles
Dutch colonial architecture
Architecture in Indonesia
Neoclassical architecture